No todo lo que brilla es oro is a Mexican telenovela produced by Ernesto Alonso, Valentín Pimstein and Guillermo Gonzalez Camarena for Canal de las Estrellas in 1978.

Cast 
Pancho Córdova
María Rojo
Roberto Cobo
Luis Torner
Lina Michel
Pedro de Aguillón
Héctor Ortega
Pituka de Foronda
Tita Greg

References

External links 
 

Mexican telenovelas
1978 telenovelas
Televisa telenovelas
Spanish-language telenovelas
1978 Mexican television series debuts
1978 Mexican television series endings